Mulao, also known as Ayo, is a possibly extinct Kra language spoken in Guizhou, China. Spoken in Longli County and Majiang County in Guizhou, it is estimated that the language may be extinct or have only have a few living speakers. As of 2011, there are no newspapers, radio programs, or television broadcasts in the language, and it is not recognized by the government, nor taught in schools. Mulao speakers are classified as Gelao people by the government of China, but Mulao speakers do not understand the Gelao languages. It is closely related to A'ou.

Demographics
The Mulao number 28,000 people, and are distributed in Majiang, Kaili, Huangping, Duyun, Weng'an, Fuquan, and other counties of southeastern Guizhou. The Mulao of Xuanwei and Jidong villages refer to themselves as the Mu, and in Longli village they call themselves .

The last speaker in Longli County was recorded by Bo Wenze (2003).

Documentation
Monographs of Mulao include Bo (2003) and Luo (1997). A word list is also given in Zhang (1993).

Mulao data from Majiang and Kaili is also given in Guizhou (1985).

References

External links 

 Basic Mulao vocabulary database compiled by the University of Auckland
 Mulao numerals compiled by the Max Planck Society

Kra languages
Languages of China